The Dansalan Bato Ali Mosque is a mosque in Marawi, Lanao del Sur, Philippines.

The original structure was built sometime in the 1950s, which was burned and converted to a cemetery during the Martial law period. The mosque was rebuilt with reconstruction works finished in 1980.

During the siege of Marawi in May 2017, the mosque was among the structures captured by ISIL affiliated Maute group militants. Philippine government forces regained control of the city but several structures including the Bato Mosque was left heavily damaged after the battle.

The Bato Mosque was declared structurally unsound and it was deemed that it would be more feasible to demolish the structure and reconstruct a new one in its place. The Task Force Bangon Marawi will lead the demolition and reconstruction and Maranao architects were hired for the project. The move had consent from the Marawi Sultanate League, the administrating body of the mosque representing Lanao area's non-sovereign sultanates.

Demolition work of the current structure is set to begin on July 20, 2020.

References

Mosques in Mindanao
Marawi
Buildings and structures in Lanao del Sur